Malta has been participating at the Deaflympics since 2001 and has yet to win any medals.

Malta yet to participate at the Winter Deaflympics.

Medal tallies

See also
Malta at the Paralympics
Malta at the Olympics

References

External links
Deaflympics official website
2017 Deaflympics

Nations at the Deaflympics
Parasports in Malta